LoKoKo Bisons Loimaa is a Finnish professional basketball club that is based in Loimaa.

History

The club was established in 1964 as Loimaan Korikonkarit. The team was renamed Bisons after it was promoted to the Korisliiga in 2011. The team won the Finnish league championship in its first season in the league. Bisons won the championship once again in 2013, and qualified to play in Europe's 2nd-tier competition, the Eurocup, during the Eurocup 2013–14 season.

On 31 May 2016, Bisons Loimaa announced it will not participate in the top Finnish league due to financial problems and would join the second division.

Arenas
The club plays its national domestic league home games at the Loimaa Sports Center in Loimaa. Its VTB United League home games are played in Loimaa and at the Energia Areena in Vantaa.

Trophies
Korisliiga
Champions (2): 2011–12, 2012–13
Runners-up (1): 2014–15

Current roster

Notable players

Season by season

References

External links
Official Website 
Eurobasket.com Team Page

Loimaa
Basketball teams in Finland
Basketball teams established in 1964
1964 establishments in Finland